William John Edward Jessop (13 July 1902 – 11 June 1980) was an Irish academic, medical practitioner and an independent member of Seanad Éireann.

He was a Professor of Social Medicine at Trinity College Dublin (TCD). he was appointed professor of physiology and biochemistry in the Royal College of Surgeons in 1929, and served as physician at the Meath Hospital from 1930 to 1980.

He was elected to the 7th Seanad on 12 March 1952 at a by-election for the Dublin University constituency caused by the death of Gardner Budd. He was defeated at the 1954 Seanad election but was again elected at a by-election on 13 May 1960 caused by the death of William Fearon. He was re-elected to the 10th (1961), 11th (1965) and 12th (1969) Seanad. He lost his seat at the 1973 Seanad election.

Following his retirement from TCD, he became visiting professor of chemical pathology at the University of Ife in Nigeria.

References

1902 births
1980 deaths
Independent members of Seanad Éireann
Members of the 7th Seanad
Members of the 9th Seanad
Members of the 10th Seanad
Members of the 11th Seanad
Members of the 12th Seanad
Academics of Trinity College Dublin
Members of Seanad Éireann for Dublin University
Presidents of the Royal College of Physicians of Ireland